Sidi Hamadouche ( Arabic: سيدي حمادوش) is a community in the Algerian province Sidi Bel Abbes with 9,264 inhabitants in 1998.

Near Sidi Hamadouche, there is a large mediumwave broadcasting, station, which transmits the program of "Chaîne 1" on 549 kHz with 600 kW.
One of the three masts of the facility, which is situated at 35°17'16N 000°34'57W is 270 metres tall and is among the tallest manmade structures in Algeria.

External links 

 Radio & TV Stations of Algeria: Frequency List and Transmitter Gallery

Communes of Sidi Bel Abbès Province
Cities in Algeria